The  is a professional golf tournament played in Japan. Founded in 1971, it has been a Japan Golf Tour event since 1979. Since 1998, the event has been prefixed , with the top finishers gaining exemptions into The Open Championship.

The Mizuno Open has been held at several course, most recently at Setonaikai Golf Club in Kasaoka, Okayama in 2021.

The purse for the 2021 event was ¥80,000,000, with ¥16,000,000 going to the winner.

History
The Mizuno Open was founded in 1971 as the Mizuno Tournament with both men's and women's events running side-by-side. It was restricted to golfers using at least ten Mizuno clubs. In 1979, fifty leading professionals in Japan were also eligible to compete as the tournament counted towards the Japan Golf Tour money-list ranking for the first time. In 1983 it became a full tour event and in 1985 changed its name to the Mizuno Open. From 1991, the women's event was played separately.

Since 1998, the event has been prefixed "Gateway to The Open", with the top four finishers in the tournament that were not already qualified gaining exemptions into The Open Championship. There has also been a mini-money list of Japan Golf Tour events up to and including the Mizuno Open that earns two exemptions into The Open. From 2007 to 2010 The Mizuno Open merged with the Yomiuri Open to form the Gateway to The Open Mizuno Open Yomiuri Classic.

Tournament hosts

Winners

Source:

Notes

References

External links

Coverage on the Japan Golf Tour's official site

Japan Golf Tour events
Golf tournaments in Japan
Recurring sporting events established in 1971
1971 establishments in Japan